Codium australasicum is a species of seaweed in the Codiaceae family.

It is repeatedly dichotomous and has terete branches.

In Western Australia is found along the coast in two places; near Rockingham and Albany. Its range extends around southern Australia, including Tasmania to Tuggerah in New South Wales as well as on the coast of New Zealand.

References

australasicum
Plants described in 1956